Farhat Mohammad Khan is a Pakistani politician who has been a member of the National Assembly of Pakistan from 2008 to July 2012.

Political career
He was elected to the National Assembly of Pakistan as a candidate of Muttahida Qaumi Movement from NA-245 (Karachi-VII) in 2008 Pakistani general election. In July 2012,  Supreme Court of Pakistan suspended his National Assembly membership for having US citizenship.

References

Pakistani MNAs 2008–2013
Living people
Year of birth missing (living people)